is  the Head coach of the Kawasaki Brave Thunders in the Japanese B.League.

Career statistics 

|-
| align="left" |  2007-08
| align="left" | Toshiba
| 2 ||  || 3.0 || .000 || .000 || .000 || 1.0 || 1.0 || 0.0 || 0.0 || 0.0
|-
| align="left" |  2008-09
| align="left" | Toshiba
| 7 ||  || 2.6 || .455 || .250 || 1.000 || 0.4 || 0.3 || 0.0 || 0.0 || 2.1
|-
| align="left" |  2009-10
| align="left" | Toshiba
| 41 ||  ||13.9 || .310 || .290 || .750 || 1.0 || 1.6 || 0.3 || 0.1 || 3.1
|-
| align="left" |  2010-11
| align="left" | Toshiba
| 36 ||  ||17.7 || .412 || .291 || .576 || 1.9 || 1.9 || 0.5 || 0.0 || 4.2
|-

Head coaching record

|-
| style="text-align:left;"|Kawasaki Brave Thunders
| style="text-align:left;"|2019-20
| 40||31||9|||| style="text-align:center;"| 1st in Central|||-||-||-||
| style="text-align:center;"|-

1979 births
Living people

Japanese basketball coaches
Kawasaki Brave Thunders coaches
Kawasaki Brave Thunders players

References